John Oakley House is a historic home located at West Hills in Suffolk County, New York. It is a -story, six-bay, gable-roofed dwelling with a 1-story, one-bay, gable-roofed west wing and one-bay, shed-roofed east wing. The original structure was built about 1720 and expanded in the 1780s.

It was added to the National Register of Historic Places in 1985.

References

Houses on the National Register of Historic Places in New York (state)
Houses completed in 1780
Houses in Suffolk County, New York
National Register of Historic Places in Suffolk County, New York